Hasret is a Turkish given name which is used for both female and male. People with the name include:

Given name
 Hasret Altındere (born 1980), Turkish footballer
 Hasret Gültekin (1971–1993), Kurdish musician
 Hasrat Jafarov (born 2002), Azerbaijani wrestler
 Hasret Kayikçi (born 1991), German footballer

Turkish feminine given names
Turkish masculine given names